Anna Pavlovna Filosofova (née Diaghileva; August 5, 1837 – March 17, 1912) was a Russian philanthropist and feminist. She was an important charity organiser, and, alongside Maria Trubnikova (1835–1897) and Nadezhda Stasova (1822–1895), was one of the founders and leaders of the first organised Russian women's movement.

Biography

Early life
Filosofova was born into a wealthy noble family in Saint Petersburg. Her father Pavel Diaghilev was an official with the Ministry of Finance who retired in 1850 and started a distillery business. In 1855 he became fanatically religious, and the responsibility of the family business was transferred to Anna's mother. Anna was the youngest of nine children. She received her education at home, following the custom of noble families of the time. In 1855 she married Vladimir Dmitryevich Filosofov, a powerful official in the Ministry of War and Defence. Anna had six children, including the writer Dmitry Filosofov.

Anna's husband came from a serf-owning family, and after their marriage she made frequent visits to the Filosofov estate in Bezhanitsy. Filosofov's father was known as a tyrannical figure, and the lifestyle at the estate had a powerful effect on Anna. It was here that she first began to reflect on social problems, and especially the plight of poor peasants and serfs. Her first philanthropic activities concerned providing food and medicine to the poor. It was around this time that she met Maria Trubnikova, a woman interested in social change who gave Anna books on women's issues and discussed them with her. Anna said of Maria that she was "an angel, gentle and patient. She developed me, read with me. This was hard, since I didn't know anything."

Career
In 1860, Anna, Maria, and their friend Nadezhda Stasova founded the "Society for Cheap Lodging and Other Aid to the Residents of Saint Petersburg", based on a new philanthropic method. Filosofova believed that instead of giving cash benefits to the poor, it was better to train and educate them so that they could earn a living on their own. They provided low cost housing for poor women and sewing work from local businesses. The society acquired its own building, and a large contract for sewing work from the military. Anna and her friends founded several societies including the "Society for the organisation of Work for Women" and the "Women's Publishing Artel".

After the Crimean war, Russia instituted great reforms in the education system and, while opening universities for non noble males, also founded 131 schools for girls, of which 37 offered higher education. Filosofova was the founder of one of the literary discussion circles which were fashionable at the time, together with Trubnikova and Stasova: Trubnikova, the daughter of one of the participants of the Decembrist revolt, was a friend of Josephine Butler and acquainted with Western feminist literature.

The most ambitious undertaking of Anna and her associates was the promotion of education for women. In 1867 they sent a petition with four hundred signatures to Tsar Alexander II asking permission to open the first higher education courses for women at Saint Petersburg State University. There was strong resistance from conservatives to the admission of women to the University, and they weren't supported by the Education Minister Dmitry Tolstoy. Tolstoy did allow women to begin attending lectures by University professors, often for free. In 1871 these informal courses were given the name "Vladimirsky", after the name of the college where they were held. The reaction to the courses by upper-class society was decidedly negative. Many female students went abroad in order to complete their education. The courses were closed in 1875. In 1876 Anna was able to get official permission to open the first Russian women's university, known as the Bestuzhev Courses after their nominal founder Konstantin Bestuzhev-Ryumin.

Later life
Anna was known for her kindness and generosity, and she was often approached for help by the families of convicted and exiled revolutionaries. Her sympathies for these revolutionaries were unpopular with Russian officials. In 1879 she was exiled abroad for giving aid to revolutionary organisations, and only allowed to return in 1881. After the assassination of the Tsar in 1881, Anna, now known for her revolutionary sympathies, couldn't find supporters for further social projects. Her husband's official position was also weakened because of her revolutionary connections, and the family was forced to live more modestly.

Anna returned to public life in the late 1880s and early 1890s when she began providing assistance for starving people in the Volga Region. In 1892 she joined the "Saint Petersburg Committee for the Promotion of Literacy". In 1895 she founded and chaired the "Charity Association of Russian Women", a feminist organisation that was officially denominated a charity organisation because all forms of political activity were banned in Russia. The same year, a women's university of medicine was founded in Russia, and in 1904 women's university courses were again allowed outside of the capital. In connection with this, Filosofova was recognized by the Tsar for her work within the "Society for the Finance of Education courses for Women". In 1905, the universities of Russia were opened to women and the women's university courses were no longer necessary. The same year, men were granted suffrage and political activity was permitted, after which the women's group presented their first demand for women suffrage.

Anna was elected chairman of the International Council of Women in 1899. She participated in the Russian Revolution of 1905, joining the Constitutional Democratic Party and eventually acting as chairman of the first Russian women's congress in 1908. Anna's aims of unifying Russian women were unsuccessful, mostly due to the number of factions within the movement. After the congress, Anna and some of her associates received deprecating letters from the ultra-conservative Duma deputy Vladimir Purishkevich. Anna made the letter public and took Purishkevich to court, where he was sentenced to one month in jail.

In 1908 Anna joined the Russian Theosophical Society, which she had helped to set up. In 1911 Russia celebrated the fiftieth jubilee of Anna's public activities, representing the progress and achievements of the women's movement in Russia. The jubilee was attended by more than one hundred women's organisations who presented addresses, along with several foreign groups. She was also honored by deputies of the Duma at the Mariinsky Palace. She died in Saint Petersburg, and her funeral was attended by thousands of people.

References

1837 births
1912 deaths
Feminists from the Russian Empire
Russian women's rights activists
Philanthropists from the Russian Empire
19th-century people from the Russian Empire
Russian untitled nobility
19th-century philanthropists